Kerkrade dialect (natively  or   or simply  / , literally 'Kerkradish', Standard Dutch: ,) is a Ripuarian dialect spoken in Kerkrade and its surroundings, including Herzogenrath in Germany. It is spoken in all social classes, but the variety spoken by younger people in Kerkrade is somewhat closer to Standard Dutch.

The most similar other Ripuarian dialects are those of Bocholtz, Vaals and Aachen.

The only dictionary of the Kerkrade dialect considers it to be a Ripuarian variety, but most native speakers treat it as a Southeast Limburgish dialect and call it  /  ('Limburgish'),  /  ('Kerkradish') or simply  /  ('dialect'). The name  is strictly a scientific term on both sides of the border.

A distinct East Limburgish dialect called Egelzer plat is spoken in Eygelshoven, in the north of the Kerkrade municipality.

Vocabulary
The Kerkrade dialect has many loanwords from Standard High German, a language formerly used in school and church. However, not all German loanwords are used by every speaker.

An example sentence:

Phonology

As most other Ripuarian and Limburgish dialects, the Kerkrade dialect features a distinction between the thrusting tone (or ), which has a shortening effect on the syllable (not shown in transcriptions in this article) and the slurring tone. In this article, the slurring tone is transcribed as a high tone, whereas the thrusting tone is left unmarked. This is nothing more than a convention, as the phonetics of the Kerkrade pitch accent are severely under-researched. There are minimal pairs, for example  /   'wall' -  /   'carrot'.

 The sounds corresponding to Limburgish  are very back after back vowels, being uvular  (as in Luxembourgish), rather than velar as in Limburgish.
 The palatal  is an allophone of  after consonants, the front vowels and the close-mid central , which phonologically is a front vowel.

  occurs only in unstressed syllables.
  is a phonological back vowel like , and the two function as a long–short pair. The former is phonetically central , whereas the latter is a genuine back vowel .

Spelling
The spelling presented here, which is to a large extent Dutch-based is used in Kirchröadsjer dieksiejoneer, the only dictionary of the Kerkrade dialect. The notes are mostly aimed at native speakers of Dutch (including those that can read Limburgish) and German.

Standard Dutch  ).

References

Bibliography

 
 
 

Central German languages
Dutch dialects
German dialects
Ripuarian language